Moonfleet is a British period television drama series which aired on Sky One in 2013. It is based on the classic 1898 adventure novel Moonfleet by J. Meade Falkner, about smuggling on the Dorset coast in the eighteenth century. Location shooting took place in Ireland.

Cast
 Ray Winstone as Elzevir Block
 Aneurin Barnard as  John Trenchard
 Sophie Cookson as Grace Mohune 
 Anthony Ofoegbu as Loder 
 Phil Daniels as  Ratsey
 Lorcan Cranitch as Meech 
 Pippa Haywood as Aunt Lydia
 Nick Lee as  Officer James
 Ian McElhinney as  Rev Glennie 
 Lesley Vickerage as Aunt Jane
 Ben Chaplin as Magistrate Mohune
 Fionn Walton as Davey Block
 Frank O'Sullivan as Blackbeard
 Omid Djalili as Aldobrand2 
 Steve Gunn as  Jailer
 Martin Trenaman as Turn-Key 
 Nicholas Woodeson as Bailiff

References

External links
 

2013 British television series debuts
2013 British television series endings
2010s British drama television series
Sky UK original programming
Television series set in the 18th century
Television shows based on British novels
2010s British television miniseries
Television series by All3Media
English-language television shows
Television shows set in Dorset
Television shows set in Ireland